A tenor (from Latin tenor – holder, or tenere – hold) is a type of classical male singing voice whose vocal range or section is higher than baritone and lower than countertenor. A person, instrument, or group that performs in that range or the tenor clef is also called a tenor.

Tenor may also refer to:

Finance 
 Tenor (finance), the duration or time-to-maturity of a bond or swap
 The coupon frequency of an equity swap

Music 
 The name of a search technology planned for KDE 4.
 In change ringing, the bell with the lowest pitch
 The reciting tone, also called recitation tone, of a Gregorian chant
 A tenor saxophone 
 A tenor drum 
 Tenor (album)

Other uses 
 Tenor (linguistics), the relationship between participants in a discourse
 Tenor (website), a GIF search engine and database
 10.or mobile phone
 The Tenor, a retail complex in Toronto, Canada